This is a list of schools in Southern District, Hong Kong.

Secondary schools

 Aided
 Aberdeen Baptist Lui Ming Choi College
  (香港仔工業學校)
 Caritas Chong Yuet Ming Secondary School (明愛莊月明中學))
  (香港航海學校)
 Hong Kong True Light College
  (嘉諾撒培德書院)
  (培英中學)
 Sacred Heart Canossian College
 San Wui Commercial Society  (新會商會陳白沙紀念中學)
  (聖公會呂明才中學)
  (聖伯多祿中學)
 Yu Chun Keung Memorial College No. 2 (余振強紀念第二中學)

 Direct Subsidy Scheme
  (港大同學會書院)
 St Stephen's College

 English Schools Foundation
 South Island School
 West Island School

 Private
 Canadian International School
 German Swiss International School (Pok Fu Lam Campus)
 Han Academy (漢鼎書院)
 Hong Kong International School
 Independent Schools Foundation Academy
 Singapore International School
 The Harbour School (港灣學校)
  (滬江維多利亞學校)
  (香港威雅學校)

Primary schools

 Government
 Hong Kong Southern District Government Primary School (香港南區官立小學)
 Island Road Government Primary School (香島道官立小學)

 Aided
 Aberdeen St Peter's Catholic Primary School (香港仔聖伯多祿天主教小學)
 Aplichau Kaifong Primary School (鴨脷洲街坊學校)
 Precious Blood Primary School (South Horizons) (海怡寶血小學)
 Precious Blood Primary School (Wah Fu Estate) (華富邨寶血小學)
 Pui Tak Canossian Primary School (嘉諾撒培德學校)
 SKH Chi Fu Chi Nam Primary School (聖公會置富始南小學)
 SKH Tin Wan Chi Nam Primary School (聖公會田灣始南小學)
 St Peter's Catholic Primary School (聖伯多祿天主教小學)
 TWGH Hok Shan School (東華三院鶴山學校)

 Direct Subsidy Scheme
 St Paul's Co-Edu College Primary School (聖保羅男女中學附屬小學)
 St Paul's College Primary School (聖保羅書院小學)
	
 English Schools Foundation
 Kennedy School

 Private
 German Swiss International School (Pok Fu Lam Campus)
 Kellett School
 Singapore International School
 St Stephen's College Preparatory School (聖士提反書院附屬小學)
 The Harbour School (港灣學校)
 Victoria Shanghai Academy (滬江維多利亞學校)
 Wycombe Abbey School Hong Kong (香港威雅學校)

Special schools
 Aided
 Ebenezer New Hope School (心光恩望學校)
 Ebenezer School (心光學校)
 HK Juvenile Care Centre Chan Nam Cheong Memorial School (香港青少年培育會陳南昌紀念學校)
 Hong Kong Red Cross John F. Kennedy Centre (香港紅十字會甘迺迪中心)
 Hong Kong Red Cross Hospital Schools The Duchess of Kent Children's Hospital at Sandy Bay (香港紅十字會醫院學校)
 Hong Kong Red Cross Hospital Schools Queen Mary Hospital (香港紅十字會醫院學校)
 Marycove School (瑪利灣學校)
 TWGH Tsui Tsin Tong School (東華三院徐展堂學校)

Former schools
 Pokfulam Government Primary School - Now the German Swiss School Pok Fu Lam Campus.

References

Lists of schools in Hong Kong
Southern District, Hong Kong